Mark Boerebach is an Australian savant, able to recall Australian music chart top hits from the 1970s and 1980s.

Personal life
Boerebach was born blind and diagnosed with Asperger syndrome as a child. Prior to entering school, he underwent a series of operations which restored 20% of his eyesight, although he is blind in one eye. His condition made it difficult for him to socialize at school, but despite the difficulties he encountered, Boerebach has completed five TAFE music business courses. He lives in Sydney, Australia.

Career
Boerebach founded an Internet radio station called 2PR FM based in Sydney which plays continuous 1970s and 1980s pop music.
 He has been described as having the ability to instantly list all the songs on a particular chart from any given week in the 1980s and is able to recall roughly 15 years of Australian music chart top hits, an ability that has been reported as one result of his Asperger syndrome. One of Boerebach's teachers at TAFE, Russell Kilby, contacted him after reading about him in local papers, and encouraged him to try out for the RocKwiz television show. Fellow students helped raise funds for the trip to Melbourne to try out for the show, and after passing the public eliminations at St Kilda's Espy, and meeting with Glenn Baker, the three-time winner of the BBC's Rock Brain of the Universe, he appeared on the television game-show "RocKwiz". A documentary of his preparations for and appearance on the game show was aired under the name Rainman goes to RocKwiz and was shown at the Anchorage International Film Festival in 2010. In 2011, the documentary won an Aloha Accolade at the Hololulu Films Awards.

References

External links
2PR FM Official Website

Australian radio personalities
Autistic savants
Living people
People from Sydney
People with Asperger syndrome
Australian blind people
Year of birth missing (living people)